Rustic Wedding Symphony, Op. 26 (Ländliche Hochzeit) is a symphony in E flat major by Karl Goldmark, written in 1875, a year before his renowned Violin Concerto No. 1.
The symphony was premiered in Vienna on 5 March 1876, conducted by Hans Richter. Johannes Brahms, who was a frequent walking companion of Goldmark's, and whose own Symphony No. 1 was not premiered until November 1876, told him "That is the best thing you have done; clear-cut and faultless, it sprang into being a finished thing, like Minerva from the head of Jupiter". Its first American performance was at a New York Philharmonic Society concert, conducted by Theodore Thomas on 13 January 1877.

Structure 
The work does not conform to the standard structure of a symphony, and it could just be named a Suite. It is in five movements rather than the usual four, which is same as Beethoven's Pastoral Symphony, Berlioz's Symphonie fantastique and Schumann's Rhenish Symphony. It is full of Central European charm, joviality and good humour.  While Goldmark did not provide any specific program for the work, he did give each of the movements titles suggestive of aspects of a wedding in the countryside.

Reception 
The Rustic Wedding Symphony was a favourite of conductors such as Thomas Beecham and Leonard Bernstein.  It has been recorded a number of times, by conductors such as Beecham, Bernstein, André Previn, Maurice Abravanel, Jesús López-Cobos, Yondani Butt and Stephen Gunzenhauser.

References

External links

Sources 
 Ethan Mordden: A Guide to Orchestral Music
  David Ewen: Music for the Millions – The Encyclopedia of Musical Masterpieces
 Raymond Monelle: The Musical Topic

Compositions by Karl Goldmark
Romantic symphonies
1875 compositions